Bhairavakona is a holy place situated on the heart of Nallamala Hills in the Prakasam district of the Indian State of Andhra Pradesh. The name Bhairavakona originated from the fact that temple of Sri Trimukha Durgamba Mahadevi along with Sri Barguleshwari Swamy temple is present at that place and Kaala Bhairava Swamy guards the location. The main deity has three faces in which Goddess Saraswathi devi is seeing her face in the mirror. The temple is carved from a single stone, Eka sila. This place is home to an ancient Shiva temple. There is waterfall which falls from a height of 200 metres and there are eight temples carved in the hill there. An interesting feature that attracts devotees to Bhairavakona is that the moonlight falls on the idol of goddess Parvati at a temple there on Kartika Poornima day.it is a beautiful water fall in prakasam district.

An important notice to the pilgrims, as the tourism authorities has been developing the area recently, those who travel there in unseason should take care of food provisions. It is hard to stay there at night although there are Panchayat guest rooms.(only 2).

References

Shiva temples in Andhra Pradesh
Villages in Prakasam district